Mahmut Ustaosmanoğlu (1927 – 23 June 2022), usually referred to as Mahmut Effendi and known to his disciples as "Efendi Hazretleri", was a Turkish Sufi Sheikh and the leader of the influential İsmailağa jamia of the Naqshbandi-Khalidiyya Ṭarīqah centred in Çarşamba, Istanbul.

Early life
Ustaosmanoğlu was born in a village imam in Miço (now Tavşanlı) village of the Of district. He became a hafiz under his father by the age of 6 and continued his madrasa education, gaining his ijazah by the age of 16. Afterward he married his cousin and started his work as an imam.

Naqshbandi order
In 1952, Ustaosmanoğlu met Ahıskalı Ali Haydar Efendi (Gürbüzler), a Naqshbandi sheikh who became his murshid. Ali Haydar Efendi appointed him as the imam of the İsmailağa Mosque in 1954. By the year 1960, Ustaosmanoğlu's life had its greatest turn after Ali Haydar Efendi's demise and he became the leader of the path (tariqa). In 1996, he retired as the imam of the İsmailağa Musjid.

Later life
Ustaosmanoğlu tried to keep a low profile in the following years, especially after the 1997 memorandum, but his relations came under the public spotlight with a series of internal strife in the sect. His son-in-law Hızır Ali Muratoğlu was murdered in 1998 and in 2006, a retired imam named Bayram Ali Öztürk was murdered in the mosque and the man who stabbed him to death was lynched by the congregation.

Recep Tayyip Erdoğan is known to maintain close relations with Ustaosmanoğlu. Erdoğan paid a highly publicised visit to Ustaosmanoğlu the night before the presidential election in 2014.

Ustaosmanoğlu died on 23 June 2022, after two weeks of hospitalization for an infection.

Khalid’îyyah, İsmailağa jamia and tarīqah silsila

References

1929 births
2022 deaths
People from Of, Turkey
Turkish Sunni Muslim scholars of Islam
Turkish Sufis
20th-century imams
21st-century imams